Andrea Magi (born 14 July 1966 in Pesaro, Pesaro e Urbino) is a former amateur boxer from Italy. He is best known for winning the bronze medal at the 1987 European Championships in Turin, Italy in the Men's Light Heavyweight (– 81 kg) division. He represented his native country at the 1988 Summer Olympics in Seoul, South Korea.

Professional boxing record

|-
|align="center" colspan=8|20 Wins (7 knockouts, 13 decisions), 4 Losses (2 knockouts, 2 decisions) 
|-
| align="center" style="border-style: none none solid solid; background: #e3e3e3"|Result
| align="center" style="border-style: none none solid solid; background: #e3e3e3"|Record
| align="center" style="border-style: none none solid solid; background: #e3e3e3"|Opponent
| align="center" style="border-style: none none solid solid; background: #e3e3e3"|Type
| align="center" style="border-style: none none solid solid; background: #e3e3e3"|Round
| align="center" style="border-style: none none solid solid; background: #e3e3e3"|Date
| align="center" style="border-style: none none solid solid; background: #e3e3e3"|Location
| align="center" style="border-style: none none solid solid; background: #e3e3e3"|Notes
|-align=center
|Loss
|
|align=left| Dariusz "Tiger" Michalczewski
|TKO
|4
|20/03/1998
|align=left| Frankfurt, Hesse, Germany
|align=left|
|-
|Win
|
|align=left| Ignacio Orsola
|TKO
|1
|15/02/1998
|align=left| Rijeka, Croatia
|align=left|
|-
|Win
|
|align=left| Frank Wuestenberghs
|PTS
|6
|06/12/1997
|align=left| Catanzaro, Calabria, Italy
|align=left|
|-
|Loss
|
|align=left| "Fast" Eddy Smulders
|TKO
|2
|20/01/1996
|align=left| Marsala, Sicily, Italy
|align=left|
|-
|Win
|
|align=left| Karoly Kovacs
|TKO
|5
|01/09/1995
|align=left| Supino, Lazio, Italy
|align=left|
|-
|Win
|
|align=left| Pietro Pellizzaro
|PTS
|8
|22/10/1994
|align=left| Pesaro, Marche, Italy
|align=left|
|-
|Loss
|
|align=left| "Gentleman" Henry Maske
|UD
|12
|04/06/1994
|align=left| Dortmund, North Rhine-Westphalia, Germany
|align=left|
|-
|Loss
|
|align=left| Leeonzer Barber
|UD
|12
|29/09/1993
|align=left| Pesaro, Marche, Italy
|align=left|
|-
|Win
|
|align=left| Sylvester White
|PTS
|8
|30/04/1993
|align=left| Pesaro, Marche, Italy
|align=left|
|-
|Win
|
|align=left| Renald De Vulder
|TKO
|2
|22/10/1992
|align=left| Verbania, Piedmont, Italy
|align=left|
|-
|Win
|
|align=left| Marco Rinaldo
|TKO
|11
|24/06/1992
|align=left| Godiasco, Lombardy, Italy
|align=left|
|-
|Win
|
|align=left| Salvatore Di Salvatore
|PTS
|12
|12/03/1992
|align=left| Pesaro, Marche, Italy
|align=left|
|-
|Win
|
|align=left| Simon McDougall
|TKO
|5
|19/10/1991
|align=left| Terni, Umbria, Italy
|align=left|
|-
|Win
|
|align=left| Marco Rinaldo
|UD
|12
|01/06/1991
|align=left| Ragusa, Sicily, Italy
|align=left|
|-
|Win
|
|align=left| Jean-Noel Camara
|PTS
|4
|12/01/1991
|align=left| Saint Vincent d'Aoste, Valle d'Aosta, Italy
|align=left|
|-
|Win
|
|align=left| Janos Ferenc Dobai
|PTS
|6
|12/10/1990
|align=left| Pesaro, Marche, Italy
|align=left|
|-
|Win
|
|align=left| Serge Kabongo
|PTS
|6
|02/06/1990
|align=left| Rome, Lazio, Italy
|align=left|
|-
|Win
|
|align=left| James "Sting" Wray
|DQ
|3
|29/11/1989
|align=left| Pesaro, Marche, Italy
|align=left|
|-
|Win
|
|align=left| John "Ashes to" Ashton
|PTS
|6
|07/10/1989
|align=left| Pesaro, Marche, Italy
|align=left|
|-
|Win
|
|align=left| Kabunda Kamanga
|KO
|3
|28/07/1989
|align=left| Cecina, Tuscany, Italy
|align=left|
|-
|Win
|
|align=left| Renald De Vulder
|TKO
|1
|14/07/1989
|align=left| San Vincenzo, Tuscany, Italy
|align=left|
|-
|Win
|
|align=left| Oliver Kemayou
|PTS
|6
|03/06/1989
|align=left| Pesaro, Marche, Italy
|align=left|
|-
|Win
|
|align=left| Ngoy Muamba
|PTS
|6
|29/04/1989
|align=left| Vasto, Abruzzo, Italy
|align=left|
|-
|Win
|
|align=left| Ngoy Muamba
|PTS
|6
|24/02/1989
|align=left| Pesaro, Marche, Italy
|align=left|
|}

References
 

1966 births
Living people
Light-heavyweight boxers
Boxers at the 1988 Summer Olympics
Olympic boxers of Italy
Competitors at the 1987 Mediterranean Games
Mediterranean Games silver medalists for Italy
People from Pesaro
Italian male boxers
Mediterranean Games medalists in boxing
Sportspeople from the Province of Pesaro and Urbino